KDSC (91.1 FM) is a radio station licensed to serve Thousand Oaks, California. The station is owned by the University of Southern California, and is a repeater of KUSC and their classical music format. The KDSC signal previously competed with that of translator K216FM for the 91.1 FM frequency on the Los Angeles Westside. That translator rebroadcast KKLQ (FM), the Los Angeles affiliate of the contemporary Christian music network K-Love, until the translator's license was cancelled on May 8, 2020.

KDSC broadcasts in HD.

External links
kusc.org

References

DSC
NPR member stations
Classical music radio stations in the United States
Radio stations of the University of Southern California